SLX4 (also known as BTBD12 and FANCP) is a protein involved in DNA repair, where it has important roles in the final steps of homologous recombination. Mutations in the gene are associated with the disease Fanconi anemia.

The version of SLX4 present in humans and other mammals acts as a sort of scaffold upon which other proteins form several different multiprotein complexes.  The SLX1-SLX4 complex acts as a Holliday junction resolvase.  As such, the complex cleaves the links between two homologous chromosomes that form during homologous recombination. This allows the two linked chromosomes to resolve into two unconnected double-strand DNA molecules.  The SLX4 interacting protein interacts with SLX4 in the DNA repair process, specifically in interstrand crosslink repair. SLX4 also associates with RAD1, RAD10 and SAW1 in the single-strand annealing pathway of homologous recombination. The DNA repair function of SLX4 is involved in sensitivity to proton beam radiation.

Model organisms
Model organisms have been prominent in the study of SLX4 function. It was identified in 2001 during a screen for lethal mutations in yeast cells lacking a functional copy of the Sgs1 protein.  Based on that, SLX4 was grouped with several other proteins produced by SLX (synthetic lethal of unknown function) genes.

A conditional knockout mouse line, called Slx4tm1a(EUCOMM)Wtsi was generated as part of the International Knockout Mouse Consortium program, a high-throughput mutagenesis project to generate and distribute animal models of disease to interested scientists.

Male and female animals underwent a standardized phenotypic screen to determine the effects of deletion. Twenty four tests were carried out on mutant mice and ten significant abnormalities were observed. A viability at weaning study found less homozygous mutant animals were present than predicted by Mendelian ratio. Homozygous mutant animals of both sexes were sub-fertile and homozygous females had a reduced body weight, body length, heart weight, platelet count and lean mass. Homozygotes of both sex had abnormal eye sizes, narrow eye openings, skeletal defects (including scoliosis and fusion of vertebrae), and displayed an increase in DNA instability as shown by a micronucleus test. This and further analysis revealed the mouse phenotype to model the human genetic illness, Fanconi anemia. The association was confirmed when patients with the disease were found to have mutations in their SLX4 gene.

References

External links

DNA repair
Genes mutated in mice